"There's a Honky Tonk Angel (Who'll Take Me Back In)" is a song best known for the 1974 recording by American country music artist Conway Twitty, who took it to number 1 on the Hot Country Singles chart. The song was written by Troy Seals and Denny Rice and originally released on Troy Seals' 1973 debut album Now Presenting Troy Seals.

Conway Twitty version
Twitty's version was released in January 1974 as the first single from the album Honky Tonk Angel.  The song was Twitty's 10th number one on the U.S. country singles chart as a solo artist and 13th overall. It stayed at number one for one week and spent 12 weeks on the chart in all.

Personnel
Conway Twitty — vocals
The Nashville Sounds — vocals
Harold Bradley — 6-string electric bass guitar
Ray Edenton — acoustic guitar
Johnny Gimble — fiddle
John Hughey — steel guitar
Tommy Markham — drums
Grady Martin — electric guitar
Bob Moore — bass
Hargus "Pig" Robbins — piano

Chart performance

Cliff Richard version 

In 1974, Bruce Welch, a producer working with British singer Cliff Richard, heard the song and thought that it would make a good "comeback" single after disappointing chart performances during the previous two years.  A version was arranged for Richard by John Farrar with a string arrangement by Nick Ingman, and recorded on 20 June, 1974.  The single was released in September 1975 with the B-side "(Wouldn't You Know It) Got Myself a Girl", written by Alan Tarney and Trevor Spencer.

While recording the song, Richard incorrectly assumed that the song was about a Chinese lady from Hong Kong (a.k.a. a "Honky"), unaware that the phrase "honky-tonk angel" was an American slang term for a prostitute.  Some of his fans and friends were aware of the song's actual meaning, and expressed surprise that he had chosen to cover the song, given his Christian beliefs.  By the time Richard was made aware of his mistake, the single had been on sale for a short time in the UK, Europe, and Japan, and he had already made multiple television appearances to promote it.  He decided to make a televised announcement which called for EMI to withdraw the record, and declared that he would be refusing to promote it any further.  Even though the single was expected to perform well, EMI eventually agreed to withdraw the single at his request.

In the decades since its withdrawal, "Honky Tonk Angel" has appeared as a bonus track on the 2001 CD reissue of I'm Nearly Famous, and on the 2002 compilation The Singles Collection.  An alternate take from the same recording session appears on 2009's Lost & Found (From the Archives).

Track listing
7": EMI / EMI 2344

 "Honky Tonk Angel" – 3:03
 "(Wouldn't You Know It) Got Myself a Girl" – 3:03

Personnel

 Cliff Richard – vocals, backing vocals
 Terry Britten – guitar, backing vocals
 Alan Tarney – bass guitar, backing vocals
 Dave MacRae – piano
 Trevor Spencer – drums
 Nick Ingman Orchestra – orchestra

Charts
Despite only a thousand copies being sold, "Honky Tonk Angel" did in fact chart in the UK.  It peaked at #5 on the "Star Breakers" list, which was an officially-published BMRB list of the most popular records in the UK outside of the Top 50.  It entered the chart during the final week of September and spent a total of five weeks on the list before the single was ultimately withdrawn.

Elvis Presley version

Elvis Presley covered the track in 1975 and first released it on his Promised Land album, however it was released as the B-side of the posthumous single "I Got a Feelin' in My Body": a posthumous single in 1979,  which peaked at number 6 on the Hot Country Singles chart. Along the way, the song titles on the cover sleeve were reversed accordingly. The track was recorded at Stax Records, 15 December 1973.

Other cover versions
A cover by Dobie Gray is on his 1973 album Loving Arms.

References

1974 singles
1979 singles
Dobie Gray songs
Conway Twitty songs
Cliff Richard songs
Elvis Presley songs
Songs written by Troy Seals
Song recordings produced by Owen Bradley
MCA Records singles
EMI Records singles
RCA Records singles
1973 songs